The Abraham–Minkowski controversy is a physics debate concerning electromagnetic momentum within dielectric media. Two equations were first suggested by Hermann Minkowski (1908) and Max Abraham (1909) for this momentum. They predict different values, from which the name of the controversy derives. Experimental support has been claimed for both.

David J. Griffiths argues that, in the presence of matter, only the total stress–energy tensor carries unambiguous physical significance, and how one apportions it between an "electromagnetic" part and a "matter" part depends on context and convenience.

Several papers have claimed to have resolved this controversy.

References

External links
 Physical Review Focus: Momentum From Nothing
 Physical Review Focus: Light Bends Glass

Electric and magnetic fields in matter
Hermann Minkowski
1908 introductions